Walter Thirring  (29 April 1927 – 19 August 2014) was an Austrian physicist after whom the Thirring model in quantum field theory is named.  He was the son of the physicist Hans Thirring.

Life and career
Walter Thirring was born in Vienna, Austria, where he earned his Doctor of Physics degree in 1949 at the age of 22. In 1959 he became a professor of theoretical physics at the University of Vienna, and from 1968 to 1971 he was head of the Theory Division and director at CERN.

Besides pioneering work in quantum field theory, Walter Thirring devoted his scientific life to mathematical physics. He is the author of one of the first textbooks on quantum electrodynamics as well as of a four-volume course in mathematical physics.

In 2000, he received the Henri Poincaré Prize of the International Association of Mathematical Physics.

Walter Thirring authored Cosmic Impressions, Templeton Press, Philadelphia and London, in 2007, and in that book he sums up his feelings about the scientific discoveries made by modern cosmology:In the last decades, new worlds have been unveiled that our great teachers wouldn’t have even dreamed of.  The panorama of cosmic evolution now enables deep insights into the blueprint of creation… Human beings recognize the blueprints, and understand the language of the Creator… These realizations do not make science the enemy of religion, but glorify the book of Genesis in the Bible.
His memoirs were published in 2010 as The Joy of Discovery: Great Encounters Along the Way by World Scientific Publishing Company.  He recollects encounters with scientists like Albert Einstein, Erwin Schrödinger, Werner Heisenberg, Wolfgang Pauli and others as well as his collaborations with Murray Gell-Mann and Elliott Lieb.

Honours and awards
 Eötvös Medal (1967)
 Erwin Schrödinger Prize (1969)
 Max Planck Medal of the German Physical Society (1978)
 Prize of the city of Vienna (1978)
 Austrian Decoration for Science and Art (1993)
 Honorary Medal of the Austrian capital Vienna in Gold (1993)
 Honorary doctorate from the Comenius University in Bratislava (1994)
 Henri Poincaré Prize of IAMP (International Association of Mathematical Physics) 2000
 Member of the Austrian Academy of Sciences
 Member of the German Academy of Sciences Leopoldina, Halle
 Member of the Pontifical Academy of Sciences, Rome
 Member of the National Academy of Sciences, USA
 Member of the Academia Europaea
 Member of the Hungarian Academy of Sciences

Works
 Selected papers of Walter E. Thirring with Commentaries. American Mathematical Society, 1998, 
 Einführung in die Quantenelektrodynamik. Deuticke, Wien 1955
 Principles of quantum electrodynamics. Academic Press, New York 1958; 2nd edn. 1962
 with Ernest M. Henley: Elementare Quantenfeldtheorie. BI Verlag, Mannheim 1975 
 Erfolge und Misserfolge der theoretischen Physik. In: Physikalische Blätter Jg. 33 (1977), p. 542ff. (Singularitäty theorem of Stephen Hawking and Roger Penrose, KAM-theory, stability of matter, lecture delivered at the presentation of the Max Planck medal)
 Lehrbuch der Mathematischen Physik. Springer (trans. into English by Evans M. Harrell as A course in mathematical physics)
1. Klassische Dynamische Systeme. 1977, ; trans. as Classical dynamical systems (1978)
2. Klassische Feldtheorie. 1978, ; trans. as Classical field theory (1978)
3. Quantenmechanik von Atomen und Molekülen. 1979, ; trans. as Quantum mechanics of atoms and molecules (1979)
4. Quantenmechanik großer Systeme. 1980, ; trans. as Quantum mechanics of large systems (1983)
Stabilität der Materie. In: Naturwissenschaften. Springer, Berlin Jg. 73 (1986), p. 705ff.
 Kosmische Impressionen. Gottes Spuren in den Naturgesetzen. Molden, Wien 2004, 
 Einstein entformelt. Wie ein Teenager ihm auf die Schliche kam. Seifert Verlag, Wien 2007, co-author Cornelia Faustmann, 
 Lust am Forschen: Lebensweg und Begegnungen. Seifert Verlag, Wien 2008,

Notes

References

 Thirring, Walter, Cosmic Impressions: Traces of God in the Laws of Nature, Templeton Press (May 31, 2007). .
Emch, Gérard G. "Laudatio".
"Thirring reaches his 80th birthday", CERN Courier Jul 18, 2007.

1927 births
2014 deaths
Austrian Christians
Austrian physicists
Mathematical physicists
Members of the Austrian Academy of Sciences
People associated with CERN
Members of the Pontifical Academy of Sciences
Schrödinger Prize recipients
Foreign associates of the National Academy of Sciences
Recipients of the Austrian Decoration for Science and Art
Members of Academia Europaea
Members of the Hungarian Academy of Sciences
Winners of the Max Planck Medal
Presidents of the International Association of Mathematical Physics